Bejuco is a district of the Nandayure canton, in the Guanacaste province of Costa Rica. Located on the Nicoya Peninsula.

Geography 
Bejuco has an area of  km² and an elevation of  metres.

Villages
Administrative center of the district is the village of Bejuco.

Other villages in the district are Caletas, Candelillo, Corozalito, Chiruta, Chompipe (partly), I Griega, Islita, Jabilla, Jabillos, Maicillal, Maquencal, Milagro, Millal, Mono, Pampas, Paso Vigas, Pecal, Playa Coyote, Playa San Miguel, Pueblo Nuevo, Punta Bejuco, Puerto Coyote, Quebrada Nando, Quebrada Seca, Rancho Floriana, San Francisco de Coyote, San Gabriel, San Miguel, Triunfo and Zapote.

Demographics 

For the 2011 census, Bejuco had a population of  inhabitants.

Transportation

Road transportation 
The district is covered by the following road routes:
 National Route 160
 National Route 163
 National Route 623
 National Route 903
 National Route 915

References 

Districts of Guanacaste Province
Populated places in Guanacaste Province